Ctenocystoidea is an extinct clade of echinoderms, which lived during the Cambrian and Ordovician periods. Unlike other echinoderms, ctenocystoids had bilateral symmetry, or were only very slightly asymmetrical. They are believed to be one of the earliest-diverging branches of echinoderms, with their bilateral symmetry a trait shared with other deuterostomes. Ctenocystoids were once classified in the taxon Homalozoa, also known as Carpoidea, alongside cinctans, solutes, and stylophorans. Homalozoa is now recognized as a polyphyletic group of echinoderms without radial symmetry. Ctenocystoids were geographically widespread during the Middle Cambrian, with one species surviving into the Late Ordovician.

Description

Like other echinoderms, ctenocystoids had a skeleton made of stereom plates. Ctenocystoids had near bilateral symmetry, with some species exhibiting slightly asymmetric plate shapes. Like cinctans and Ctenoimbricata, most ctenocystoids had large marginal plates surrounding the sides of their body, but unlike cinctans and Ctenoimbricata, which had only one row of marginal plates, most ctenocystoids had two rows of marginal plates. Courtessolea had only one row of marginal plates, like cinctans and Ctenoimbricata, whereas Conollia lost the marginal plates entirely. The anus of ctenocystoids was surrounded by a pyramidal periproct as in other echinoderms. It was located at the posterior end, defining a clear anterior-posterior body axis unlike other echinoderms.

All ctenocystoids had a ctenoid apparatus, a comb-like arrangement of movable plates at the anterior end of the animal. Beneath the ctenoid apparatus was a mouth, bordered on each side by a food groove.

Classification

Relationships

Ctenocystoids are likely among the most basal stem-group echinoderms. They have also been interpreted as aberrant blastozoans and as stem-group hemichordates. The presence of stereom plates indicates that they most likely belong to the echinoderm total group, rendering a hemichordate affinity unlikely.

Courtessolea was probably the most basal ctenocystoid, given its anatomical similarities to Ctenoimbricata and cinctans. Conollia and Jugoszovia may be closely related to each other, as both have a reduced marginal frame compared to other ctenocystoids.

Genera
The following genera of ctenocystoids have been named:

Distribution
Ctenocystoids were widespread during the Middle Cambrian, and have been found in the United States, the United Kingdom, Australia, France, the Czech Republic, Poland, Spain, and Morocco. The earliest ctenocystoids date to the beginning of Stage 5 of the Cambrian, now known as the Wuliuan age, or possibly slightly earlier, in late Cambrian Stage 4. Most species date to the Wuliuan and Drumian ages of the Cambrian. The geologically youngest ctenocystoid, the only one known from the Ordovician, is Conollia, from the Sandbian of the United Kingdom.

History

The class Ctenocystoidea was named in 1969 by Richard A. Robison and James Sprinkle. It originally contained one species, Ctenocystis utahensis. The name comes from the Greek words ktenos, meaning "comb", and kystis, meaning "sac". It was originally assigned to the echinoderm subphylum Homalozoa.

References

Paleozoic echinoderms
Prehistoric deuterostome classes
Homalozoa